Digital ecology is a science about the interdependence of digital systems and the natural environment. This field of study looks at the methods in which digital technologies are changing the way we interact with the environment, as well as how these technologies affects the environment itself. It is a branch of ecology that promotes green practices to fight digital pollution. Digital ecology is becoming more and more important every day because the total carbon footprint of the internet, our electronic devices, and supporting elements add up to about 3.7% of global greenhouse gas emissions (including about 1.4 per cent of overall global carbon dioxide emissions).

Overall, digital ecology is a complex and multifaceted field that requires a holistic approach to understanding the relationship between digital technologies and the natural world. As our reliance on digital technologies continues to grow, it is important to consider the environmental consequences of these technologies and work towards more sustainable solutions.

Negative impact on the environment 
One of the main areas of focus in digital ecology is the impact of electronic waste, or e-waste. As more and more devices become obsolete and are replaced with newer models, the amount of e-waste being produced is increasing at an alarming rate. This e-waste often ends up in landfills, where it can leach harmful chemicals into the soil and water supply.

Another aspect of digital ecology is the energy consumption of digital technologies and the digital pollution in causes. The production and use of digital devices requires significant amounts of energy, and as the demand for these devices increases, so does the amount of energy required to meet this demand.. The total carbon footprint of the internet, our electronic devices, and supporting elements add up to about 3.7% of global greenhouse gas emissions. It is as much as for the airline industry and the number keeps on rising. This increase in energy consumption has a negative impact on the environment, as it contributes to climate change and air pollution. Research has shown, that if the internet was a country, it would be the seventh largest polluter in the world, by some estimates.

Digital Pollution 
Digital pollution is a crucial aspect of digital ecology. It is the main problem against which digital ecology is fighting. Digital pollution refers to the negative impact of digital technology and electronic waste on the environment and human health. This can include emissions from electronic devices, toxic chemicals in electronic waste, and the proliferation of e-waste in landfills.

Every user of technology in everyday life contributes to the creation of digital pollution. These pollutants includes but not limited to:

 Data clouds and servers - keeping many data on clouds and servers and transfering them contribute to air pollution through the energy used to power and cool these data centers and sending the data. The energy consumption of data centers results in emissions of greenhouse gases, such as harmful carbon dioxide. The energy is generated by power plants, which often burn fossil fuels such as coal, oil, and natural gas, releasing harmful pollutants into the air. In addition, the air conditioning systems used to cool the servers also consume a significant amount of energy and release heat into the environment. This is primarily influenced by large databases, but people's day-to-day activities are also not insignificant. An example of this would be storing and accessing emails. An average year of emailing emits about 136 kilograms of CO2. One inbox consumes enough energy to run a hot shower for about 4 minutes, which is equal to illuminating 40 lightbulbs for an hour and equal to pollution by driving a car 212 metres. Addictionally, data centers consume large amounts of energy to power and cool the servers that store and process spam email data, resulting in emissions of greenhouse gases and other pollutants.
 Producion of electronic devices -  can have harmful effects on the environment for several reasons: increasing the demand for raw materials, energy, and other resources, and contribute to environmental degradation through the associated pollution and waste. Buying new equipment every six years rather than every four reduces carbon dioxide production by 190 kg.
 Energy-inefficient electronics - they consume more electricity, which in turn requires more energy to be generated, often from power plants that burn fossil fuels. Additionally, inefficient electronics also generate more heat, which requires more energy for cooling, further increasing the total energy consumption and associated emissions. When these electronic devices reach the end of their lifespan and are disposed of, they can also become electronic waste, which can release toxic chemicals into the environment.
 Unnecessary charging of electronic devices - can contribute to air pollution through the increased energy consumption. Unnecessary charging of devices, such as smartphones or laptops, increases the overall energy demand and contributes to emissions from power plants. Overall, charging smartphones generates more carbon dioxide than charging laptops.
 Electronic waste -  electronic devices eventually reach the end of their lifespan and become waste. The improper disposal of electronic waste can release toxic chemicals into the environment, contaminating soil and water, and harming wildlife.

Positive impact on the environment 
Despite the environmental impact of electronic devices and data centers, digital technologies can also have positive impacts on the environment in various ways:

 Energy efficiency: Digital technologies can help increase energy efficiency through the use of smart energy systems, such as smart grid systems and energy-efficient devices.
 Reduced waste: The use of digital technologies can reduce waste by reducing the need for paper and other physical materials.
 Enhanced education: Digital technologies can enhance education by providing access to information and resources, promoting sustainable practices and environmental awareness.

References

Bibliography 

 "Digital Ecology: The Complete Guide". June 9, 2022
 "Digital ecology", Philonomist. November 10, 2021
 "Sustainable Web Design", Tom Greenwood

Technology
Systems ecology
Environmental sociology